The Jeddo Tunnel (also called the Jeddo Mine Tunnel) is a drainage tunnel at water level in Pennsylvania. It is one of the Coal Region's biggest discharges of mine water. The tunnel is five miles (eight kilometers) long and was constructed between 1891 and 1894, and at the time of its construction, was reputed to be the largest mine drainage tunnel in the world. It consists of major tunnels A and B, and minor tunnels C, D and X.

Description
It also drained the collieries of G.B. Markle & Company. On average the tunnel drains  of water each minute. Sometimes the tunnel drains up to 100,000 gallons per minute. The tunnel is about 5 miles (8 kilometers) long and runs between Black Creek and the hills in Butler Valley. The Jeddo Tunnel is located close to the community of Drums. The tunnel drains the nine major minepools in the area via gravity.

The Jeddo Tunnel drains the mines in 13 nearby communities. These communities are Hollywood, Lattimer, Minesville, Drifton, Harleigh, Sandy Run, Ebervale, Humboldt, Cranberry, Harwood, Stockton, and the Eckley Miners' Village.

Hydrology
The base runoff was  inches and the evapotranspiration was  inches. The Jeddo Tunnel is the largest carrier of water away from the Jeddo Tunnel watershed. There are several streams on the surface, such as Black Creek, Little Black Creek, Hazle Creek, and Cranberry Creek. Besides minepools, contributors to the flow of the tunnel include precipitation draining through mines, seepage of streams, and water falling through sinkholes and cave-ins.

The tunnel's discharge is lowest in November. The specific conductance of the water in the Jeddo Tunnel is on average around 728 micromohs.

Water quality
At the end of the 1990s, the sulfate, iron, manganese, and aluminum levels in the Jeddo Tunnel were significantly lower than in previous years. The pH of the tunnel water has also risen significantly.

The pH of the water in the Jeddo Tunnel ranges between approximately 3.6 and 5.0, and averages around 4.3. The tunnel water's pH level is the lowest at the end of summer and the beginning of autumn.  The most commonly occurring cation in the water of the tunnel is magnesium, which occurs in concentrations of 52 mg/L. Calcium is another cation that occurs in the tunnel water, at concentrations of 35 mg/L. Sodium and potassium also occur in the water from the Jeddo Tunnel, at concentrations of 12 and 2.2 mg/L, respectively.  There are also several other metals in the tunnel's water. The iron concentration ranges from 2 to 90 mg/L and averages at 9 mg/L. The manganese concentration ranges from 1.4 to 6.8 mg/L and averages at 4.2 mg/L.  The aluminum concentration ranges from 2.5 to 44 mg/L.  The zinc concentration in the tunnel water averages at 0.7 mg/L. The iron, aluminum, and manganese concentrations are all several times higher than the ideal concentration. Common anions in the tunnel's water include sulfate and chloride. These occur at concentrations of 284 and 13.5 mg/L, respectively. The concentration of solids in the water of the Jeddo Tunnel ranges between 265 and 6800 mg/L. The average concentration is 900 mg/L.  The solids consist of 125 milligrams per liter of suspended solids and 140 to 6675 mg/L of dissolved solids. The concentration of solids in the water has been decreasing since at least the 1990s.

History
The original builders of the Jeddo Tunnel suspected that the local farmers, who used Little Nescopeck Creek as their water supply, would not approve of mine waters from the tunnel polluting the creek. Because of this, the lawyer Thomas McNair bought the right of way along the creek.

The basic geology of the Jeddo Tunnel's watershed was created 345 million years ago, during the Carboniferous Period.  The Jeddo Tunnel itself was established at the end of the 19th century. John Markle was one of the people involved in designing the tunnel; he spent three years and  $1,000,000 on the construction of the tunnel. Two teams of workers used compressed air drills and explosives to build the tunnel from both ends. A total of 250 workers were involved in the construction of the tunnel. The construction finished on September 15, 1894. The construction of the Jeddo Tunnel used up 170 tons of forcite, a Belgian gel dynamite. The Jeddo Tunnel's original purpose was to remove the water from deep coal mines in the eastern middle anthracite field. However it also connects to mining operations near Hazleton. The construction of the tunnel involved the channeling of streams, as well as the construction of haulageways. When constructed, the tunnel was considered to be an engineering marvel; however, in modern times, Alan C. Gregory describes it as "a dinosaur that survived extinction". The tunnel ceased to be used in 1955, when the deep-mining industry stopped, and the mines in the area were largely abandoned in 1961. However Pagnotti Enterprises still mines anthracite in the vicinity of the tunnel. The water quality of the Jeddo Tunnel has improved slightly since the deep-mining industry stopped.

The Jeddo Tunnel has been the subject of a number of studies. Between 1949 and 1950, group led by a person named Ash gathered data on the tunnel's water quality and discharge. The Hazleton City Authority conducted a study at the beginning of the 1970s, attempting to determine if the tunnel's outflow was of suitable quality for drinking water.  The United States Geological Survey monitored the tunnel's water quality and flow in 1975 and again in 1991.  The Wildlife Conservancy, Bloomsburg University, and the Susquehanna River Basin Commission all studied the Jeddo Tunnel between 1995 and 1998.  The National Renewable Energy Laboratory once conducted a study to determine whether it would be worthwhile to install a hydroelectric system in the Jeddo Tunnel. Several studies have attempted to fix the pollution coming from the tunnel but their proposed plans cost at least $15,000,000 and take at least 20 years.

Construction of additional tunnels
The main tunnels of the Jeddo Tunnel A and B were built in 1895. Jeddo Tunnel B goes from Jeddo Mammoth Vain slope number 9 to the beginning of Jeddo Tunnel A, a distance of  feet. Jeddo Tunnel C was created in 1926. Jeddo Tunnel D was created in 1929. The final addition to the Jeddo Tunnel was Jeddo Tunnel X, which was constructed in 1934. It joins the main tunnel system at the confluence of Jeddo Tunnels A and B.

Environmental impact, media impact and controversies
The Jeddo Tunnel was initially received positively. The Philadelphia Press and the New York Herald both printed a piece on the tunnel on December 9, 1894, calling the tunnel a "remarkable feat of engineering".

The water that the Jeddo Tunnel drains is polluted due to past mining in its vicinity. The Jeddo Tunnel drains into Little Nescopeck Creek, thus polluting the creek and consequently Nescopeck Creek, the Susquehanna River, and the Chesapeake Bay.  The construction of the tunnel has partially contributed to the width of Little Nescopeck Creek increasing from around 10 feet to between 30 and 40 feet. The tunnel is the only source of acid mine drainage that flows into Little Nescopeck Creek. The Jeddo Tunnel has eroded the banks of Little Nescopeck Creek.

One contaminant in the Jeddo Tunnel is aluminum. The tunnel also discharges coal dust and sediment containing heavy metals. These materials collect along the banks of Little Nescopeck Creek. Two people were killed in the Jeddo Tunnel on February 5, 1894. The tunnel also takes in sewage, hydrocarbons, and runoff pollution.

Reducing tunnel discharge 
Several proposed measures have been introduced to reduce the discharge of the Jeddo Tunnel. One of these methods is to seal fissures, cave-ins, and sinkholes in the Jeddo Tunnel watershed. This could reduce the Jeddo Tunnel's discharge by 11%. Diverting runoff from the hills around the coal basins near the Jeddo Tunnel is another method of reducing the tunnel's discharge, and this could reduce the discharge by 10%. Creating perimeter drains to pick up runoff from nearby ridges is another proposed method of reducing the tunnel's discharge.

See also
Audenried Tunnel coal mining drainage in Luzerne County
Catawissa Tunnel coal mining drainage in Schuylkill County
Green Mountain Tunnel coal mining drainage in Schuylkill County
Oneida Number One Tunnel coal mining drainage in Schuylkill County
Oneida Number Three Tunnel coal mining drainage in Schuylkill County
Quakake Tunnel coal mining drainage in Carbon County

References

1894 establishments in Pennsylvania
coal mining in the United States
drainage tunnels in the United States
transportation buildings and structures in Luzerne County, Pennsylvania
tunnels in Pennsylvania
Mining in Pennsylvania
Environment of Pennsylvania
Tributaries of Nescopeck Creek
Tunnels completed in 1894